Edward Lively (1545 – May 1605) was an English linguist and biblical scholar. He studied at Trinity College, Cambridge, where he became a Fellow, He was Regius Professor of Hebrew from 1575 to 1605. His published works include Latin expositions of some of the minor prophets, as well as a work on the chronology of monarchs of Persia.

He played an active role during the planning for the King James Version of the Bible, and his death from a peritonsillar abscess is said to have considerably delayed commencement of the work. He left eleven children to be cared for by his widow, with paltry income from his prebend at Peterborough and the generosity of his patron, William Barlow.  [Note: McClure (p. 104) indicates Lively predeceased his wife, leaving eleven orphans.]

References

McClure, Alexander. (1858) The Translators Revived: A Biographical Memoir of the Authors of the English Version of the Holy Bible. Mobile, Alabama: R. E. Publications (republished by the Marantha Bible Society, 1984 ASIN B0006YJPI8 )
Nicolson, Adam. (2003) God's Secretaries: The Making of the King James Bible. New York: HarperCollins 

1545 births
1605 deaths
Alumni of Trinity College, Cambridge
Translators of the King James Version
Infectious disease deaths in England
Deaths from peritonsillar abscess
16th-century English people
17th-century English people
Academics of the University of Cambridge
Regius Professors of Hebrew (Cambridge)
16th-century Anglican theologians
17th-century Anglican theologians